The discography of American rock musician Duff McKagan consists of two solo studio albums and three singles, with additional discography with different bands.

Albums

Promo only 

 Beautiful Disease - 1999

EPs

Singles

Promo singles

Other appearances 
Studio

Live

Guest

Band work

With Vains

With Fastbacks 
Single

Other appearance

With 10 Minute Warning 
Album

EP

With Guns N' Roses 

Albums

EPs

Singles

Other appearance

With The Fartz

With Neurotic Outsiders

With Loaded

With Velvet Revolver

With Walking Papers

With Kings of Chaos

With The Living

With Max Creeps

References 

Rock music discographies
Discographies of American artists
Discography